Spooky Buddies is a 2011 Canadian-American supernatural comedy film that is part of the Disney Buddies franchise, a series often referred to as the Air Bud and Air Buddies franchise. For the fifth installment in the Air Buddies series, the plot follows the team as they have a Halloween adventure in Fernfield to stop the evil Warwick the Warlock and save the town. The film was directed by Robert Vince, produced by Anna McRoberts, and released by Walt Disney Studios Home Entertainment on Blu-ray, DVD, and as a film download on September 20, 2011.

Plot
In 1937, Sheriff Jim and others from the town of Fernfield set off to the manor of Warwick the Warlock. Warwick has kidnapped five puppies so he can sacrifice them to the Halloween Hound, an evil hellhound who can open a portal to ghosts but only if he has the souls of five puppies of the same blood. One of the puppies, Pip, belongs to a young boy named Joseph. As the mob prepares to storm the manor, the hound turns Pip's siblings to stone, but Pip escapes. Warwick chases him and grabs him just as the mob enters. The Warlock manages to escape just as dawn approaches. Thus, when the hound tries to kill Pip he fails. Pip then turns to stone and becomes a ghost. Jim and Deputy Tracker surround Warwick; however, he jumps in the mirror and escapes. Joseph takes Pip's stone body while his father takes Warwick's spellbook. The Sheriff takes Warwick's staff and announces to the townspeople that he would board up Warwick's house to prevent anything else from happening.

75 years later, the Buddies are on a school trip to Warwick's manor with their owners, Alice, Billy, Pete, Sam and Bartleby. When the class go to the graveyard to see Deputy Tracker's memorial stone, Billy finds himself scared of the appearance of the gravedigger, Mr. Johnston. Overhearing that the legend says that if you say "Halloween Hound" three times in front of Warwick's mirror, you would release the Halloween Hound. B-Dawg, who is a "scaredy cat", tries to overcome his fear by entering the condemned manor and say "Halloween Hound" three times in front of the mirror. Pip the ghost puppy tries to warn the Buddies, but B-Dawg is terrified by Pip's ghost and accidentally completes the reciting. B-Dawg's owner, Billy hasn't come up with his History project and decides to do it on the Halloween Hound. With the help of Sheriff Dan, Billy borrows Warwick's evidence file and staff. Billy's mother, Janice, buys Billy his costume for trick-or-treating, which is a Christmas Story-esque bunny suit, having misheard him saying, "Hip Hop Rabbit", when he meant "Hip Hop Rapper". Billy goes as Warwick the Warlock and humiliates B-Dawg in the bunny outfit. Billy meets up with his friends and the Buddies and they go trick-or-treating.

Two punks, Rodney and Skip, who had scared the class earlier on during the trip, go explore the manor. They witness the release of Warwick and the Halloween Hound who step out of the mirror. Warwick, thinking that Rodney and Skip released them, turns them into rats after accusing them of stealing his staff. Warwick learns from his owl assistant, Hoot, that his staff is in the hands of Billy. Warwick immediately sets off to search for his staff and spell book. As he is searching the streets, he believes that the town is already taken over as everyone is dressed up for Halloween. He sends the Halloween Hound to find the Buddies, who ask for help from a sorceress dog named Zelda. It is here that Pip explains he is not trying to hurt them, but to warn them that the Halloween Hound is coming. After using a spell to return Pip to his body, the Hound finds them and turns Sniffer and Zelda to stone. The kids are running from Warwick and hide in the Halloween party where Warwick finds his staff. They are rescued by Mr. Johnston (who is actually Pip's owner).

Warwick takes the pups hostage in his manor and says that if the book isn't returned, he will kill them. The Buddies have a daring escape from Warwick the Warlock. After escaping, the Buddies run from the Hound who has turned Pip back to stone and opened the portal. The evil spirits who've escaped the mirror turn everyone in the town into zombies and monsters. Meanwhile, Hoot decides to stop and leave but is also turned to stone by the Hound. Warwick steals his book back and shoots his staff at Mr. Johnston.

The Buddies hide in the kitchen where Budderball starts devouring pickled eyeballs. The Halloween Hound finds them and B-Dawg comes up with a plan. Just when the Halloween Hound is about to suck out Budderball's soul, B-Dawg signals Budderball who farts, releasing out gas, repelling the magic and causing the Halloween Hound to have his own soul sucked out. The kids and Mr. Johnston find Warwick paralyzed after opening the Bible and Billy takes Warwick's staff. He reads the spell which returns the evil spirits and undoes the hounds evil, such as turning people into stone. Mr Johnston destroys the staff to prevent Warwick from coming back.

Mr. Johnston is reunited with Pip as well as the kids being reunited with the Buddies. The kids bid goodbye to Mr. Johnston, who has located the owners of Pip's brothers and sisters and travels around America to return them. The Buddies bid farewell to Pip who thanks them for helping him defeat Warwick. The film ends with the kids waving goodbye to Mr. Johnston as he drives off with the caravan and the puppies.

Cast
 Harland Williams as Warwick the Warlock
 Rance Howard as Mr. Joseph Johnston
 Pat Finn as Mr. Carroll / Frankendude
 Jennifer Elise Cox as Mrs. Carroll
 Michael Teigen as Deputy Dan
 Elisa Donovan as Janice
 Sierra McCormick as Alice
 Skyler Gisondo as Billy
 Sage Ryan as Pete
 Jake Johnson as Sam
 Hardy Gatlin as Skip
 Tucker Albrizzi as Bartleby
 Max Charles as young Joseph
 Dylan Sprayberry as Rodney

Voice cast
 G. Hannelius as Rosebud
 Skyler Gisondo as B-Dawg
 Charles Henry Wyson as Buddha
 Nico Ghisi as Budderball
 Ty Panitz as Mudbud
 Frankie Jonas as Pip, a Beagle puppy
 Debra Jo Rupp as Zelda, a Chinese Crested Dog
 Diedrich Bader as Halloween Hound, an English Mastiff
 Ryan Stiles as Hoot, a Eurasian eagle owl
 Tim Conway as Deputy Sniffer

Release

Home media
Spooky Buddies was released on DVD, Blu-ray, and as a movie download on September 20, 2011. The physical release was produced in two different packages: a 2-disc Blu-ray/DVD combo pack and a 1-disc DVD. The movie download was produced in both standard and high definition. All versions of the release include an interview by Leo Howard of Disney Channel's Leo Little's Big Show with the character "Rosebud" and a music video for the song "Monster Mash".

References

External links
 Official website
 

Canadian direct-to-video films
2011 direct-to-video films
American direct-to-video films
American children's comedy films
2010s English-language films
Direct-to-video sequel films
Disney direct-to-video films
American children's films
American films about Halloween
Films about shapeshifting
Films about dogs
Films directed by Robert Vince
Air Bud (series)
Films about wizards
Canadian children's comedy films
2011 films
2010s Canadian films
2010s American films